The 2012 California Vulcans football team represented California University of Pennsylvania in the 2012 NCAA Division II football season. They were led by first year head coach Mike Kellar and played their home games at Adamson Stadium. They were a member of the Pennsylvania State Athletic Conference. They finished the season 8–3, 5–2 in PSAC West play to finish in a tie for third place along with Slippery Rock.

Schedule

 Source: Schedule

Game summaries

Hillsdale
Sources:

at Kutztown
Sources:

at Edinboro
Sources:

IUP
Sources:

West Chester
Sources:

at Clarion
Sources:

Lock Haven (homecoming)
Sources:

at Gannon
Sources:

Slippery Rock
Sources:

at Mercyhurst
Sources:

Millersville
Sources:

References

California
California Vulcans football seasons
California Vulcans football